Bridge Riegel is a flat-topped rock ridge on the north side of Greenville Valley, immediately above Greenville Hole, in the Convoy Range, Victoria Land. The feature provides a platform that overlooks the entire valley, similar to the bridge of a ship. It was so named by a 1989–90 New Zealand Antarctic Research Program field party.

References
 

Ridges of Victoria Land
Scott Coast